Father–Daughter Day (sometimes called National Father–Daughter Day) is a holiday recognized annually on the second Sunday of October in the United States, honoring the relationship between a father and a daughter. Unlike Mother's Day and Father's Day, it is not federally recognized.

History
The U.S. holiday was originally conceived by Smokey Robinson to honor his relationship with his only daughter. In human development the relationship between fathers and sons overshadows the bond with daughters. This holiday promotes the development of young women through their father.
	
Robinson stated: “There are many different kinds of families today, and we know that all parental relationships are important to the healthy development of children, but the father/daughter bond is unique and one that is near to my heart. The father/daughter relationship shapes a young woman’s perspective of men and what to expect from them. I believe that female empowerment begins in the home and fathers must set a healthy example through their personal actions and interactions.”

Celebration
Examples of commemoration during Father–Daughter Day can be both commercial or intangible. Nonmaterial examples of observances during this day include embracing one another with hugs, spending quality time together, and honoring their presence in your life.

In September 2017, Rockabye Baby! Music released a lullaby version of Smokey Robinson's "My Girl" to support the holiday. In October 2017, greeting card company American Greetings announced their plan to release a line of eCards with Smokey Robinson to celebrate the launch of Father-Daughter Day.

See also
American Greetings

References 

October observances
Family member holidays
Public holidays in the United States
2017 establishments in the United States
Holidays and observances by scheduling (nth weekday of the month)
Sunday observances
Fatherhood
American culture